Michael Swanwick (born 18 November 1950) is an American fantasy and science fiction author who began publishing in the early 1980s.

Writing career
Swanwick's fiction writing began with short stories, starting in 1980 when he published "Ginungagap" in TriQuarterly and "The Feast of St. Janis" in New Dimensions 11.  Both stories were nominees for the Nebula Award for Best Short Story in 1981.
His first novel was In the Drift (an Ace Special, 1985), a look at the results of a more catastrophic Three Mile Island incident, which expands on his earlier short story "Mummer's Kiss".  This was followed in 1987 by Vacuum Flowers, an adventurous tour of an inhabited Solar System, where the people of Earth have been subsumed by a cybernetic mass-mind. Some characters’ bodies contain multiple personalities, which can be recorded and edited (or damaged) as if they were wetware.

In the 1990s, Swanwick moved towards the intersection between science fiction, fantasy, and magical realism. Stations of the Tide (1991) is the story of a bureaucrat's pursuit of a magician on a world soon to be altered by its 50-year tide swell; it is set far in the future, blurring the line between magic and technology. The Iron Dragon's Daughter (1993) is a fantasy set in a Fairyland based on modern America, with elves wearing Armani suits and dragons serving as jet fighters. The main character, a changeling stolen from the real world, struggles to survive a factory, a high school, and a university, all the while being manipulated by a dragon. In Jack Faust (1997), a retelling of the Faust legend, the scholar does not gain magical power but modern scientific knowledge with which he begins the Industrial Revolution centuries early.

In the 2000s, Swanwick wrote several series of flash fictions, beginning with Puck Aleshire's Abecedary, a collection of 26 stories, each titled for a different letter of the alphabet. Other series included The Periodic Table of Science Fiction, 118 stories each themed about a different chemical element. These were originally published in Sci Fiction. Later, The Infinite Matrix published The Sleep of Reason, in which each story was based on one of Goya’s caprichos. In this period, he won several awards for short fiction; between 1999 and 2003, he had nine stories shortlisted for the Hugo Award for Best Short Story, and won in 1999, 2000, and 2002.

He also continued to write novels. Bones of the Earth (2002) is a time-travel story involving dinosaurs. The Dragons of Babel (2008) is set in the same world as The Iron Dragon's Daughter, although the setting and characters are different; The Iron Dragon’s Mother (2019) was a third volume in the series. He has written two novels featuring the posthuman rogues Darger and Surplus, who had already appeared in short stories: Dancing with Bears (2011) concerns their adventures in post-Utopian Russia, and in “Chasing the Phoenix” (2015) they travel to China. After Gardner Dozois's death, Swanwick completed his unfinished novel City Under the Stars.

His short fiction has been collected in Gravity's Angels (1991), Moon Dogs (2000), Tales of Old Earth (2000), Cigar-Box Faust and Other Miniatures (2003), The Dog Said Bow-Wow (2007), and The Best of Michael Swanwick (2008). A novella, Griffin's Egg, was published in book form in 1991 and is also collected in Moon Dogs. He has collaborated with other authors on several short works, including Gardner Dozois ("Ancestral Voices", "City of God", "Snow Job") and William Gibson ("Dogfight").

Stations of the Tide won the Nebula for best novel in 1991, and several of his shorter works have won awards as well: the Theodore Sturgeon Memorial Award for "The Edge of the World" in 1989, the World Fantasy Award for "Radio Waves" in 1996, and Hugos for "The Very Pulse of the Machine" in 1999, "Scherzo with Tyrannosaur" in 2000, "The Dog Said Bow-Wow" in 2002, "Slow Life" in 2003, and "Legions in Time" in 2004.

Nonfiction writing
Swanwick has written about the field as well. He published two long essays on the state of the science fiction ("The User's Guide to the Postmoderns", 1986) and fantasy ("In the Tradition...", 1994), the former of which was controversial for its categorization of new SF writers into "cyberpunk" and "literary humanist" camps. Both essays were collected together in The Postmodern Archipelago 1997. A book-length interview with Gardner Dozois, Being Gardner Dozois, was published in 2001. He is a prolific contributor to the New York Review of Science Fiction. Swanwick wrote a monograph on James Branch Cabell, What Can Be Saved From the Wreckage?, which was published in 2007 with a preface by Barry Humphries, and a short literary biography of Hope Mirrlees, Hope-in-the-Mist, which was published in 2009.

Television and film 
Swanwick's short stories "Ice Age" and "The Very Pulse of the Machine" from Tales of Old Earth were adapted for the Netflix series Love, Death + Robots (2019) for its first and third seasons respectively.

Personal life
Swanwick thanks his wife, Marianne C. Porter, in all his books, referring to her as "the M. C. Porter Endowment for the Arts".

He was a friend of Gardner Dozois and Susan Caspar for many years. From this friendship grew Being Gardner Dozois and several collaborations, including the novel City Under the Stars.

Bibliography

Novels
 In the Drift (1985)
 Vacuum Flowers (1987)
 Stations of the Tide (1991), Nebula Award winner; 1991; Hugo and Campbell Awards nominee, 1992; Clarke Award nominee, 1993
 Griffin's Egg (1992)
 The Iron Dragon's Daughter (1993), Clarke, Locus Fantasy, and World Fantasy Awards nominee, 1994
 Jack Faust (1997), BSFA nominee, 1997; Hugo and Locus Fantasy Awards nominee, 1998
 Bones of the Earth (2002), Nebula Award nominee, 2002; Hugo, Locus SF, and Campbell Awards nominee, 2003
 The Dragons of Babel (2008), Locus Fantasy Award nominee, 2009
 The Iron Dragon's Mother (2019)
 City Under the Stars (2020), with Gardner Dozois

Darger and Surplus series
 Dancing With Bears (2011)
 Chasing the Phoenix (2015)

Short fiction
Collections
 Gravity's Angels (Arkham House Publishers, 1991) 
 A Geography of Unknown Lands (1997)
 Moon Dogs (2000)
 Puck Aleshire's Abecedary (2000)
 Tales of Old Earth (Tachyon Publications, 2000)
 Cigar-Box Faust and Other Miniatures (Tachyon Publications, 2003)
 Michael Swanwick's Field Guide to the Mesozoic Megafauna (Tachyon Publications, 2004)
 The Periodic Table of Science Fiction (2005) 
 The Dog Said Bow-Wow (Tachyon Publications, 2007)
 The Best of Michael Swanwick (2008)
 It Came Upon a Midnight: Three Brief Midwinter Tales (2011)
 Midwinter Elves: Three Brief Midwinter Tales (2012)
 Solstice Fire (2013)
 Season's Greetings (2014)
 Not So Much, Said the Cat (Tachyon Publications, 2016)

Short stories

 "The Feast of Saint Janis" (1980)
 "Walden Three" (1981)
 "The Man Who Met Picasso" (1982)
 "The Transmigration of Philip K." (1985)
 "The Gods of Mars" (1985) (with Gardner Dozois and Jack Dann)
 "Dogfight" (1985) (with William Gibson)
 "The Edge of the World" (1989) (Sturgeon Award winner)
 "The Dead" (1996)
 "The Very Pulse of the Machine" (1998) (Hugo Award  winner )
 "Radiant Doors" (1999) (Nebula Award nominee)
 "Ancient Engines" (1999) (Nebula Award nominee)
 "Scherzo with Tyrannosaur" (1999) (Hugo Award  winner )
 "The Dog Said Bow-Wow" (2001) (Hugo Award  winner ) 
 "Slow Life" (2002) (Hugo Award  winner)
 "'Hello,' Said the Stick" (2002) (Hugo Award nominee)
 "Legions in Time" (2003) (Hugo Award  winner)
 "Tin Marsh" (2006)
 "Urdumheim" (2007)
 "The Little Cat Laughed to See Such Sport" (2008) - a Darger and Surplus tale
 "For I Have Lain Me Down on the Stone of Loneliness and I'll Not Be Back Again" (2011)
"The Dala Horse" (2011), 3 "Best of" reprints
 The Mongolian Wizard series
"The Mongolian Wizard" (2012)
"The Fire Gown" (2012)
"Day of the Kraken" (2012)
"House of Dreams" (2013)
"The Night of the Salamander" (2015)
"The Pyramid of Krakow" (2015)
"The Phantom in the Maze" (2015)
"Murder in the Spook House" (2019)
"The New Prometheus" (2019)

Essays 
 "User's Guide to the Postmoderns", Asimov's, 1986
 "The Postmodern Archipelago" (1997) Tachyon Publications
Being Gardner Dozois (2001)
 What Can Be Saved from the Wreckage? James Branch Cabell in the 21st Century (2007)
 Hope-in-the-Mist: The Extraordinary Career & Mysterious Life of Hope Mirrlees (2011)

Critical studies and reviews of Swanwick's work
Chasing the Phoenix

References

External links 

Swanwick's weblog

Michael Swanwick's online fiction at Free Speculative Fiction Online
"October Leaves", a photo-story at Flickr

1950 births
20th-century American essayists
20th-century American male writers
20th-century American non-fiction writers
20th-century American novelists
20th-century American short story writers
21st-century American essayists
21st-century American male writers
21st-century American non-fiction writers
21st-century American novelists
21st-century American short story writers
American alternate history writers
American male essayists
American male non-fiction writers
American male novelists
American male short story writers
American science fiction writers
American speculative fiction critics
American speculative fiction writers
Asimov's Science Fiction people
Cyberpunk writers
Dark fantasy writers
Hugo Award-winning writers
Living people
The Magazine of Fantasy & Science Fiction people
Magic realism writers
Nebula Award winners
Novelists from Pennsylvania
Science fiction critics
Surrealist writers
Weird fiction writers
World Fantasy Award-winning writers
Writers from Philadelphia
Writers of fiction set in prehistoric times
Writers of historical fiction set in the modern age